Elliott is an unincorporated community and census-designated place (CDP) in Lee County, South Carolina, United States. It was first listed as a CDP in the 2020 census with a population of 370.

Elliott has a post office with ZIP code 29046, which opened on March 20, 1888.

Demographics

2020 census

Note: the US Census treats Hispanic/Latino as an ethnic category. This table excludes Latinos from the racial categories and assigns them to a separate category. Hispanics/Latinos can be of any race.

References

Unincorporated communities in Lee County, South Carolina
Unincorporated communities in South Carolina
Census-designated places in Lee County, South Carolina
Census-designated places in South Carolina